Nelu Tătaru (born September 30, 1972) is a Romanian politician. He was born in Vaslui and studied medicine at the Grigore T. Popa University of Medicine and Pharmacy in Iași. A member of the National Liberal Party (PNL), he was elected to the Senate in 2012 and served a 4-year term. He served as the Health Minister in the Orban Cabinet.

References

External links 
 

Romanian Ministers of Health
Living people
1972 births
People from Vaslui
Members of the Senate of Romania
National Liberal Party (Romania) politicians
Grigore T. Popa University of Medicine and Pharmacy alumni
Romanian surgeons
Romanian hospital administrators